General elections were held in Trinidad and Tobago on 13 September 1976. The result was a victory for the People's National Movement, which won 24 of the 36 seats. Voter turnout was 55.8%.

Results

References

Trinidad
Elections in Trinidad and Tobago
1976 in Trinidad and Tobago